Royal BAM Group nv is a Dutch construction-services business with headquarters in Bunnik, Netherlands. It is the largest construction company based on revenue in the Netherlands.

History
The company was founded by Adam van der Wal as a joiner's shop in 1869 in Groot-Ammers - a rural village in the Alblasserwaard region, which lies east of Rotterdam. It was renamed Bataafsche Aanneming Maatschappij van Bouw- en Betonwerken, in English, Batavian Construction Company for Construction and Concrete Projects plc. ('BAM') in 1927. When the company reached its 125th anniversary on 12 May 1994, it received the right to add ‘Royal’ to its name and it continued to expand through acquisition, buying Interbuild in 1998, NBM-Amstelland in 2000 and Hollandsche Beton Groep in 2002.

In July 2020, Royal BAM announced it was winding down its 600-strong BAM International business, blaming the COVID-19 pandemic for mounting losses. Up to 150 jobs would also be cut at BAM Construct UK.

In October 2022, Dutch authorities (the Fiscal Information and Investigation Service and the Public Prosecution Service) visited BAM International bv offices in Gouda, in an investigation relating to potential irregularities at some completed projects. Bam was "fully cooperating" with the investigation.

Operations

The company's major operations include:
BAM Bouw en Techniek - Non-residential construction
BAM Wonen - Residential construction
AM - Area development
BAM Infra - Civil engineering in the Netherlands
BAM Interbuild - Non-residential and residential (apartments) building in Brussels and Flanders
BAM Contractors nv - Civil engineering in Brussels and Flanders
BAM Galere - Non-residential and civil engineering in Walloon (comprising BAM Lux)
BAM Construct UK (comprising BAM Construction and BAM Properties)
BAM Nuttall - Civil engineering in the UK (comprising BAM Ritchies - geotechnical)
BAM Contractors Ltd (BAM Ireland) - Building, civil engineering, facilities management, property and rail in Ireland
BAM Deutschland - Construction in Germany
Wayss & Freytag Ingenierbau - Civil engineering in Germany; as tunnelling specialist also active as joint venture partner in BAM's other home markets)
BAM International - Projects outside of Europe
BAM PPP - Investment company

Major projects

Projects completed by the company include the Amsterdam Arena football stadium for AFC Ajax in Amsterdam completed in 1996, the Antwerp Law Courts completed in 2005 and the Euroborg football stadium for FC Groningen in Groningen completed in 2006. The company was part of the Infraspeed consortium which handed over the HSL-Zuid high-speed railway line for commercial use in 2009.

References

External links

 

 
Construction and civil engineering companies of the Netherlands
Companies based in Utrecht (province)
Bunnik
Construction and civil engineering companies  established in 1869
Dutch companies established in 1869